Arthur William George Patrick Hay, 15th Earl of Kinnoull  (26 May 1935 – 7 June 2013), styled Viscount Dupplin until 1938, was a hereditary peer, surveyor, farmer, and member of the House of Lords. His titles were Earl of Kinnoull, Viscount Dupplin and Lord Hay of Kinfauns in the Peerage of Scotland; and Baron Hay of Pedwardine in the Peerage of Great Britain.

Biography

Known as William, the 15th earl was born in 1935, the third born but first surviving son of the 14th earl and his second wife, Mary Ethel Isobel, daughter of Dr. Ferdinand Richard Holmes Meyrick and Kate Meyrick. At age 3, he succeeded his father in the earldom upon the latter's death at aged 35, of an unspecified illness. 

He was educated at Eton College and Royal Agricultural University in Cirencester. At age 22, he took his place in the House of Lords.

He was the junior conservative whip in the House of Lords in 1966-68 and opposition party spokesman on aviation. He was also  an assembly member of the Council of Europe, working at cooperation on fishing and agriculture; president of the National Council on Inland Transport, and vice-president of the National Association of Local Councils.

He worked for Langley Taylor Surveyors in London, where he was a senior partner for more than 30 years, and was a Fellow of the Royal Institution of Chartered Surveyors. He was also an active sportsman, playing squash and tennis, and was a member of the Royal Company of Archers.

He married Ann Gay Lowson, daughter of Sir Denys Lowson, 1st Baronet, on  1 June 1961. They had three children: Charles, Melissa, and Iona. Lady Kinnoull died in 2016.

References

External links
Obituary: the Earl of Kinnoull at ClanHay.org

1935 births
2013 deaths
15
People educated at Eton College
Alumni of the Royal Agricultural University
Members of the Royal Company of Archers
Conservative Party (UK) hereditary peers
Kinnoull